James Edgar Kinkeade (born October 22, 1951) is a United States district judge of the United States District Court for the Northern District of Texas.

Education and career

Born in Denton, Texas, Kinkeade received a Bachelor of Arts degree from Baylor University in 1973, a Juris Doctor from Baylor Law School in 1974, and a Master of Laws from the University of Virginia School of Law in 1998. He was a law clerk, private practice, Texas from 1974 to 1975. He was in private practice in Texas from 1975 to 1980. He was an Associate municipal judge, City of Irving, Texas from 1976 to 1980. He was a judge on the Dallas County Criminal Court No. 10, Texas in 1981. He was a judge on the Texas 194th District Court from 1981 to 1988. He is an Adjunct professor, Texas Wesleyan School of Law from 1981 to present. Judge Kinkeade is also the Jurist in Residence at Baylor University School of Law. He was a Justice, Fifth District Court of Appeals, Texas from 1988 to 2002.

District court service

Kinkeade is a United States District Judge of the United States District Court for the Northern District of Texas. Kinkeade was nominated by President George W. Bush on July 18, 2002, to a seat vacated by Elton Joe Kendall. He was confirmed by the United States Senate on November 14, 2002, and received his commission on November 15, 2002.

References

Sources

1951 births
Living people
Judges of the United States District Court for the Northern District of Texas
United States district court judges appointed by George W. Bush
21st-century American judges
People from Denton, Texas
Baylor University alumni
Baylor Law School alumni
Texas state court judges
Texas A&M University faculty